Tariquidar (INN/USAN) is a P-glycoprotein inhibitor undergoing research as an adjuvant against multidrug resistance in cancer.

References

Experimental cancer drugs
Quinolines
Benzanilides
Norsalsolinol ethers
Nicotinamides